Hoplitimyia mutabilis is a species of soldier fly in the family Stratiomyidae.

Distribution
United States, Argentina, Brazil, Costa Rica, El Salvador, French Guiana, Honduras, Mexico, Nicaragua, Panama.

References

Stratiomyidae
Insects described in 1787
Taxa named by Johan Christian Fabricius
Diptera of North America
Diptera of South America